Hibbertia orientalis is a species of flowering plant in the family Dilleniaceae and is endemic to Finch Island and White Islet in the Sir Edward Pellew Group. It is a small shrub with wiry branches, narrow lance-shaped leaves with the narrower end towards the base, and yellow flowers arranged singly on the ends of branchlets with 30 to 36 stamens arranged around two carpels.

Description
Flowering has been observed in May.

Taxonomy
Hibbertia orientalis was first formally described in 2010 by Hellmut R. Toelken in the Journal of the Adelaide Botanic Gardens from specimens collected in 1977 on White Islet in the Sir Edward Pellew Group. The specific epithet (orientalis) means "eastern", referring to the distribution of this species compared to similar hibbertias.

Distribution and habitat
This hibbertia grows is only known from Finch Island and White Islet in the Sir Edward Pellew Group off the coast of the Northern Territory.

Conservation status
Hibbertia orientalis is classified as of "data deficient" under the Territory Parks and Wildlife Conservation Act 1976.

See also
List of Hibbertia species

References

orientalis
Flora of the Northern Territory
Plants described in 2010
Taxa named by Hellmut R. Toelken